The Professorship of Music was founded in 1684, and is one of the oldest professorships at the University of Cambridge.

List of Professors of Music 

 1684 Nicholas Staggins
 1705 Thomas Tudway
 1730 Maurice Greene
 1755 John Randall
 1799 Charles Hague
 1821 John Clarke Whitfield
 1836 Thomas Attwood Walmisley
 1856 William Sterndale Bennett
 1875 George Alexander Macfarren
 1887 Charles Villiers Stanford
 1924 Charles Wood
 1926–1941 Edward Joseph Dent
 1946 Patrick Arthur Sheldon Hadley
 1962 Robert Thurston Dart
 1965 Robin Orr
 1976 Alexander Goehr
 1999 Roger Parker
 2009 Nicholas Cook
 2017 Katharine Ellis

References

Music education in the United Kingdom
Professorships at the University of Cambridge
School of Arts and Humanities, University of Cambridge
1684 establishments in England
Cambridge, University of